Tubulin beta-4A chain is a protein that in humans is encoded by the TUBB4A gene. Two tubulin beta-4 chain proteins are encoded in the human genome by the genes TUBB4A (this entry) and TUBB4B. Tubulin is the major constituent of microtubules, a key components of the cytoskeleton. It binds two molecules of GTP, one at an exchangeable site on the beta-chain and one at a non-exchangeable site on the alpha-chain. TUBB4A is preferentially and highly expressed in the central nervous system.

Clinical significance 

Mutations in TUBB4A have been associated with two neurological disorders.

An R2G substitution in the autoregulatory MREI domain of TUBB4A has been identified as the cause of 'hereditary whispering dysphonia' or DYT4.

A de novo D249N mutation has been identified as the cause of a rare leukoencephalopathy, hypomyelination with atrophy of basal ganglia and cerebellum (H-ABC).

Mutations in TUBB4A are associated with Pelizaeus–Merzbacher disease.

References

Further reading

External links